Steve Yarbrough may refer to:

 Steve Yarbrough (writer) (born 1956), novelist and short story writer
 Steve Yarbrough (politician), Republican politician in Arizona
 Steve Yarbrough (Ohio politician), Republican politician in Ohio